Carrabin is a small town located about  east-north-east of Merredin, on the railway line between Merredin and Southern Cross in Western Australia.

History
The town was gazetted in 1912, and took its name from the already existing railway siding located adjacent to the townsite. It is an Aboriginal name of unknown meaning.

In 1932 the Wheat Pool of Western Australia announced that the town would have two grain elevators, each fitted with an engine, installed at the railway siding.

It also is the site of an agricultural research station.

Rail services
The Prospector service, which runs each way between East Perth and Kalgoorlie once or twice each day, stops at Carrabin.

References

Towns in Western Australia
Grain receival points of Western Australia
Shire of Westonia